Stugeta mimetica is a butterfly in the family Lycaenidae. It was described by Per Olof Christopher Aurivillius in 1916. It is found in Tanzania.

The larvae feed on Emelianthe panganensis, Helixanthera tetrapartita and Loranthus species.

References

Endemic fauna of Tanzania
Butterflies described in 1916
Iolaini
Butterflies of Africa
Taxa named by Per Olof Christopher Aurivillius